Ynys Gybi is the name of an electoral ward in the west of Anglesey, Wales, created in 2012. It covers the most part of Holy Island, whose name is Ynys Gybi in Welsh.

Description
Ynys Gybi ward covers the six mile length of Holy Island, from North Stack in the north, to Rhoscolyn in the south. It includes the communities of Trearddur and Rhoscolyn, as well as the Holyhead town wards of Maeshyfryd and Kingsland (the remainder of Holyhead forms the neighbouring county ward of Caergybi). The Ynys Gybi ward elects three county councillors to the Isle of Anglesey County Council.

The Ynys Gybi ward was created following the Isle of Anglesey electoral boundary changes in 2012, which created 11 multi-councillor wards from 40 single-councillor wards. The new ward replaced the former county wards of Kingsland, Maeshyfryd and Trearddur, which had each elected one county councillor.

According to the 2011 UK Census the combined total population of Kingsland, Maeshyfryd and Trearddur was 6,039.

Elections results 
During the campaign of the inaugural May 2013 county elections, former Holyhead mayor Jeff Evans campaigned using the family caravan because of "the sheer size" of the 6-mile long ward. Evans succeeded in being elected as an Independent councillor, together with Plaid Cymru's Trefor Lloyd Hughes and another Independent, Dafydd Rhys Thomas. The turnout was 45.7%.

At the May 2017 county elections, Councillor Jeff Evans lost his seat to the Labour Party's Arwel Roberts. Councillors Hughes and Thomas retained their seats.

References

2012 establishments in Wales
Holy Island, Anglesey
Wards of Anglesey